Tenafly is a crime-drama series starring James McEachin that was part of The NBC Wednesday Mystery Movie wheel for the 1973-74 season. It was created by Richard Levinson and William Link, the creators of popular mystery television shows such as Columbo and Murder, She Wrote. It was the one of the first television series that season to feature an African-American character as the protagonist (the other being Shaft starring Richard Roundtree). Due to low ratings, NBC removed Tenafly from the wheel when it moved the mid-week Mystery Movie block to Tuesdays in January 1974 (the Mystery Movie block itself would only air on Sundays starting in the 1974-75 season).

Overview
The show was set in Los Angeles and starred James McEachin as Harry Tenafly, a former cop who left the department for a better paying job at a large private investigation agency, Hightower Investigations, Inc. Unlike many TV private eyes of the era, Harry Tenafly was a happily married, middle-class, suburban family man; he preferred to avoid car chases and gunfights and used brains over brawn in solving his cases. Though he left the force for the private sector to avoid the dangers inherent in police work, trouble nonetheless seemed to find Tenafly.

Cast

Episodes

References

External links
 

Television series by Universal Television
1970s American crime drama television series
NBC Mystery Movie
NBC original programming
1973 American television series debuts
1974 American television series endings
Fictional private investigators
English-language television shows
American detective television series
Television shows set in Los Angeles